Charlison Girigorio Benschop (born 21 August 1989) is a professional footballer who plays as a forward for Eerste Divisie side De Graafschap. Born in the Netherlands Antilles, he has represented the Netherlands U21 national team and the Curaçao senior national team.

Club career
Benschop played youth football with SCO '63 and VV Spijkenisse, and began his senior professional career with RKC Waalwijk during the 2007–08 season. He signed a five-year contract with AZ in March 2010.

In summer 2012, Benschop moved abroad to play in France for Stade Brest, only to move on to German side Fortuna Düsseldorf a year later.

On 4 June 2015, Benschop joined Hannover 96 from Fortuna Düsseldorf on a three-year contract.

On 11 May 2018, Benschop joined FC Ingolstadt 04 on a two-year deal.

He joined FC Groningen in July 2019.

In January 2020, Benschop signed with Apollon Limassol until 2021.

On 31 January 2022, he signed for Eredivisie club Fortuna Sittard on a contract until mid-2023.

On 1 August 2022, Benschop returned to De Graafschap on a one-year contract with an option to extend.

International career
Benschop played international football at youth level for the Netherlands. Benschop was called up to the preliminary Curaçao national team for the 2017 CONCACAF Gold Cup. Benschop made his debut for Curaçao in a 2–1 friendly win over Qatar on 10 October 2017.

Personal life
He is the uncle of Kevin Felida.

References

1989 births
Living people
People from Willemstad
Curaçao footballers
Curaçao international footballers
Dutch footballers
Netherlands youth international footballers
Dutch Antillean footballers
Dutch people of Curaçao descent
Association football forwards
Dutch expatriate footballers
RKC Waalwijk players
AZ Alkmaar players
Stade Brestois 29 players
Fortuna Düsseldorf players
Hannover 96 players
Hannover 96 II players
FC Ingolstadt 04 players
De Graafschap players
FC Groningen players
Apollon Limassol FC players
SV Sandhausen players
Fortuna Sittard players
Eredivisie players
Eerste Divisie players
Ligue 1 players
Bundesliga players
2. Bundesliga players
2019 CONCACAF Gold Cup players
Dutch expatriates in Cyprus
Dutch expatriate sportspeople in France
Dutch expatriate sportspeople in Germany
Expatriate footballers in France
Expatriate footballers in Germany
Expatriate footballers in Cyprus
VV Spijkenisse players